Ali Salman Alaaeddine (born 8 September 1993) is a Lebanese footballer who plays as a forward for  club Nejmeh.

Club career 
Born in Kuwait, Alaaeddine began his youth career in 2009 with Kuwaiti club Al-Arabi, winning the title of best emerging player, before moving on loan to Al-Sahel in 2015, where he made his senior debut. On 29 June 2017, Alaaeddine joined Lebanese Premier League side Nejmeh. He was noted for his positive performances during the 2021–22 season.

International career 
Alaaeddine made his debut for Lebanon on 2 August 2019, in a 2–1 win against Syria at the 2019 WAFF Championship.

Style of play 
Mainly a striker, Alaaeddine is also capable of playing as a right winger on occasion.

Honours
Nejmeh
 Lebanese FA Cup: 2021–22; runner-up: 2020–21
 Lebanese Elite Cup: 2017, 2018, 2021
 Lebanese Super Cup runner-up: 2021

See also
 List of Lebanon international footballers born outside Lebanon

References

External links

 
 
  (2017–present)
  (2017)
 
 

1993 births
Living people
Sportspeople from Kuwait City
Lebanese footballers
Association football forwards
Al-Arabi SC (Kuwait) players
Al-Sahel SC (Kuwait) players
Nejmeh SC players
Kuwait Premier League players
Lebanese Premier League players
Lebanon international footballers
Lebanese expatriate footballers
Expatriate footballers in Kuwait
Lebanese expatriate sportspeople in Kuwait